Paraskevoula Antoniou (born 21 November 1989), known as Skevi Antoniou, is a Cypriot footballer who plays as a forward. She has been a member of the Cyprus women's national team.

References

1989 births
Living people
Cypriot women's footballers
Cyprus women's international footballers
Women's association football forwards
Apollon Ladies F.C. players